Johan Egeberg Mellbye (11 November 1866 – 17 December 1954) was a Norwegian farmer and politician who served as the first leader of the Norwegian Centre Party from 1920–1921. He also served as Minister of Agriculture 1904–1905, then representing the Conservative Party.

His son Jan E. Mellbye ran the family farm and became chairman of the Norwegian Agrarian Association and Selskapet Ny Jord.

References

1866 births
1954 deaths
Government ministers of Norway
Ministers of Agriculture and Food of Norway
Honorary Knights Commander of the Royal Victorian Order